Events in the year 1829 in Norway.

Incumbents
Monarch: Charles III John

Events
17 May – Henrik Wergeland became a symbol of the fight for celebration of the constitution at May 17, which was later to become the Norwegian National Day. He became a public hero after the infamous "Battle of the Square" in Christiania.
The present Kvitsøy Lighthouse was built.

Arts and literature

Births

9 January – Hans Christian Harboe Grønn, barrister and politician (d. 1902).
26 March – Georg Andreas Bull, architect and chief building inspector (d.1917)
6 April – Ole Irgens, politician (d.1906)
19 May – Julius Nicolai Jacobsen, businessperson and politician (d.1894)
15 June – Ulrik Frederik Christian Arneberg, politician (d.1911)
28 July – Josephine Sparre, courtier and royal mistress
28 September – Erik Bodom, painter (d. c1879)
21 December – Hans Christian Heg, colonel and brigade commander in the Union Army during the American Civil War (d.1863)

Full date unknown
Ludvig Daae, politician (d.1893)
Hans Christian Hanssen-Fossnæs, politician
Hans Hagerup Krag, engineer (d.1907)
Niels Mathiesen, politician and merchant (d.1900)
Ole Richter, lawyer, politician and Prime Minister of Norway (d.1888)
Lorentz Henrik Müller Segelcke, politician and Minister (d.1910)

Deaths

6 April – Niels Henrik Abel, mathematician (b.1802)
6 December – Baltzar von Platen, Governor-general of Norway (b.1766)

Full date unknown
Peder Jacobsen Bøgvald, politician (b.1762)
Johan Randulf Bull, judge (b.1749)
Ole Clausen Mørch, politician (b.1774)
Lars Jakobson Thingnæsset, farmer and politician (b.1760)

See also

References